Parliamentary elections were held in the Nagorno-Karabakh Republic on 28 December 1991. A total of 81 members of the National Assembly were elected.

References

Nagorno-Karabakh
Nagorno-Karabakh
1991 in the Nagorno-Karabakh Republic
Elections in the Republic of Artsakh
Election and referendum articles with incomplete results